José Camilo Uriburu (12 June 1914 – 2 June 1996) was de facto Federal Interventor of Córdoba from March 2, 1971 to March 22, 1971.

References

Uriburu, Jose Camilo
Uriburu, Jose Camilo
Uriburu, Jose Camilo
Uriburu, Jose Camilo